Chrysauge bifasciata is a species of snout moth in the genus Chrysauge. It was described by Francis Walker in 1854. It is found in Brazil.

References

Moths described in 1854
Chrysauginae